I Need to Start a Garden is the debut studio album by American musician Haley Heynderickx. It was released in March 2018 under Mama Bird Recording Company.

Production
In an interview, Haley Heynderickx explained it took three attempts to record the album. Her first attempt was at Pendarvis Farm in Happy Valley, Oregon, with musician Colyn Cameron, however a horse had passed away during one of her songs. She explained "I lost faith in the songs and myself. The horse died". The second was at a conventional studio, but Heynderickx felt inhibited by insecurity and worries about money from the cost of the studio: "It doesn't feel like a labour of love when every moment you're in a studio it feels like you're losing money. The last thing I want to think about when capturing songs that were made from a place of love, is money." Her third attempt was made at Nomah Studios – an in-house licensing studio set up by Heynderickx's friends.

Music video
On May 2, 2018, the music video of "No Face" was released. In a statement, Heynderickx explained the song was inspired by the 2001 Japanese animated movie Spirited Away. The video was directed by Evan James Atwood.

Critical reception
I Need to Start a Garden was met with "generally favorable" reviews from critics. At Metacritic, which assigns a weighted average rating out of 100 to reviews from mainstream publications, this release received an average score of 80 based on 10 reviews. Aggregator Album of the Year gave the release a 80 out of 100 based on a critical consensus of 9 reviews.

Marcy Donelson of AllMusic said: "With eight tracks and a playing time of 30 minutes, it's an efficient debut without a weak song in the bunch, one noteworthy for its poise as well as its engaging eccentricity."

Accolades

Track listing

References

2018 debut albums
Haley Heynderickx albums